Chris Galanos (born February 7, 1982) was the pastor of Experience Life in Lubbock, Texas. He was named the youngest mega-church pastor in the country. The church was founded in his living room in 2007.

Experience Life was named the 8th fastest growing church in the nation in 2009 and the 2nd fastest growing church in the nation in 2010. Experience Life also made the Top 100 fastest growing churches list in 2012, 2013, and 2014.

Experience Life's original plan was for 10,000 people to commit join the church in 10 years. After the reaching this goal in year 8, E-Life “believed the Lord” was “leading [them] to pray” for 1,000,000 people to join in the next 10 years. As a result, the church decided to transition from a “megachurch” model to a “multiplication” model because “the way millions are coming to Christ around the world is through the multiplication of thousands of smaller churches which meet in homes, much like in the Book of Acts.” Experience Life is now supposedly meeting in many homes across West Texas and around the United States. Chris wrote about what the transition looked like to be named one of the fastest growing churches in America, to a church changing its vision for multiplication, in 'From Megachurch to Multiplication':.

The church has been the subject of some controversy surrounding its tactics for multiplication, including the inexplicable closure of a donated church: in Plains, TX.

Personal life
During his high school years, Chris became a Microsoft Certified Professional at age 15 and a Microsoft Certified Systems Engineer at age 16.

References

1982 births
Living people
People from Lubbock, Texas
Texas Tech University alumni
American Christian clergy